Alfredo Hernández is an American drummer

Alfredo Hernández may also refer to:

 Alfredo Hernández (footballer, born 1935), Mexican football midfielder
 Alfredo Hernández (footballer, born 1951), Mexican footballer
 Alfredo Hernández (rower) (born 1941), Cuban rower
 Alfredo Barba Hernández (born 1944), Mexican politician
 Alfredo Fuentes Hernández, Colombian diplomat, lawyer and economist
 Alfredo Rivadeneyra Hernández (born 1971), Mexican politician